Reymond Amsalem (born 19 July 1978) is an Israeli actress. She has appeared in more than 20 films since 2003.

She was born in Jerusalem, to a family of Moroccan-Jewish descent.

Selected filmography

External links

1978 births
Living people
Israeli people of Moroccan-Jewish descent
Israeli Sephardi Jews
Israeli film actresses
Israeli television actresses
Israeli Mizrahi Jews